Clubul Sportiv Național Sebiș, commonly known as Național Sebiș, is a Romanian football club based in Sebiș, Arad County, currently playing in the Liga V – Arad County, the fifth tier of the Romanian football league system. Founded in 1922 as Sebișana Sebiș and re-founded in 2004, Național played twelve consecutive seasons in Liga III, before withdrew due to financial problems, during the winter break of the 2019–20 season.

Național Sebiș returned after a two-year hiatus, joining the Liga VI – Arad County, the sixth tier of the Romanian football league system. The team was formed around some experienced players and the rest young players from the Sebiș area and trained by the former players Flavius Raț and Leontin Sârb. At the end of the season 2021-2022 won the League VI Arad championship and promoted to League V Arad.  Now the club has 5 groups of children and this activity is coordinated by the former great footballer Marin Dorel Balint.

History 
The young engineer Fakelman brings in Sebiș the first football ball and equipment. Knowing well the rules of the game, he gathered around youngsters and thus laid the foundation of the first football team in Sebiș. The contemporary documents show that on 15 March 1922 the club was named Sebișana. However, some sources claim that in the summer of 1920 the football team defeated Gloria Arad with the score 4–0, and the match was played in the area of bread factory. 

Since 1950 the club has been called Avântul, renamed in 1953 Crișana, this name appearing of being recorded for more than forty years, during which Crișana achieved outstanding performances and brought prestige for this small town.

Honours
Liga III
Runners-up (1): 2013–14

Liga IV – Arad County
Winners (2): 1972–73 , 2007–08
Runners-up (1): 1971–72

Liga VI – Arad County
Winners (1): 2021–22

League history

Former players

Former managers

References

External links

Football clubs in Romania
Football clubs in Arad County
Association football clubs established in 1922
1922 establishments in Romania